Garissa University is a public university in Garissa, Kenya. Its charter was awarded on October 23, 2017 by President Uhuru Muigai Kenyatta.

Overview
Garissa University was founded in 2011 as a constituent college of Moi University, in the facilities of the former Garissa Teachers Training College.

The school's library was established in 1996, as a resource for the former teacher training college. It was later staffed in 2006.

It was the first and only public post-secondary school to offer approved university degree courses in the North Eastern Province. The institution provides courses in the schools of education, information science, and arts and social sciences.

Garissa University was granted a Charter for a fully-fledged university status on 23/10/2017 by President Uhuru Kenyatta.
 
The Vice-Chancellor is Prof. Ahmed Warfa, the Deputy Vice-Chancellor Principal (Finance & Administration) is Prof. Nganga Stephen Irura, and the Deputy Vice-Chancellor (Academics) is Prof. Hussein A. Golicha. The university has 75 staff members.

2015 attack

On April 2, 2015, gunmen stormed Garissa University, killing 148 students and wounding 79 or more. The attackers claimed to be from the Al-Shabaab terrorist group and indicated that they were retaliating over non-Muslims occupying Muslim territory. The terrorists took several Christian students hostage, but freed most Muslims. The following day, national and county leaders agreed to suspend courses at the college indefinitely, to allow security services to investigate the attack. Buses were also hired to return students to their homes, and several students insisted they would not return to the university.

Approximately 650 surviving students of the University were absorbed into courses at the main Moi University campus at Eldoret. Jacob Kaimenyi, Kenya's Education cabinet secretary, urged students from the teacher training college to return to the Garissa campus which was re-opened on 5 May 2015 with improved security. Many students, however, have refused to return. The governor of Homa Bay County, Cyprian Awiti, decided to award KSh.  to each of the 16 surviving students from that county, in order to help students overcome their trauma and to make arrangements to attend school in Eldoret.

References

External links
Garissa University College Website
Website of the former Garissa Teachers Training College

 
Universities and colleges in Kenya
Garissa
Moi University
Educational institutions established in 2011
2011 establishments in Kenya